A Maiden for a Prince is a 1966 Italian comedy, starring Vittorio Gassman and Virna Lisi and based on the failed marriage between Margherita Farnese and Vincenzo Gonzaga.

Cast
Vittorio Gassman - 
Virna Lisi - 
Philippe Leroy - 
Tino Buazzelli - 
Maria Grazia Buccella - 
Vittorio Caprioli - 
Paola Borboni - 
Anna Maria Guarnieri - 
Giusi Raspani Dandolo - 
Luciano Mandolfo -

External links 
 

1966 films
1966 comedy films
1960s Italian-language films
Films directed by Pasquale Festa Campanile
Italian comedy films
1960s Italian films